Koçyiğit is a Turkish surname. Notable people with the surname include:

 Hülya Koçyiğit (born 1947), Turkish actress
 Kseniya Koçyiğit
 Servet Koçyiğit
 Yağmur Koçyiğit (born 1988), Turkish volleyball player

Turkish-language surnames